Nigel Burton (born July 30, 1976) is an American football commentator for the Pac-12 television network and the former head coach for the Portland State Vikings college football team.

Playing career
Burton grew up in Sacramento where he attended Jesuit High School. He attended the University of the Pacific in 1995, but when the school eliminated its football program the following year, he transferred to the University of Washington, where he graduated in 1999 with a bachelor's degree. He played safety for both schools' football teams. He earned all-academic honors from the Pacific-10 Conference three times at Washington and later earned a masters in business administration at the University of South Florida.

Coaching career
Burton's first coaching job was as a defensive assistant for South Florida in 2000. From 2001 to 2002, he coached defensive backs at Portland State, and then from 2003 to 2007, coached the secondary at Oregon State. In 2008, Burton was named defensive coordinator at Nevada.

In 2009, Burton was selected to replace Jerry Glanville as the head coach at Portland State. He became the second African American head football coach in school history after Ron Stratten, who coached in the early 1970s. Burton was fired after the 2014 season and compiled an overall record of 21–36 during his tenure at Portland State.

In 2015, Burton joined Pac-12 Networks as an analyst.

Personal
Burton is married and has two children.

Head coaching record

References

1976 births
Living people
American football safeties
Oregon State Beavers football coaches
Pacific Tigers football players
Portland State Vikings football coaches
South Florida Bulls football coaches
Washington Huskies football players
Players of American football from Sacramento, California
African-American coaches of American football
African-American players of American football
21st-century African-American sportspeople
20th-century African-American sportspeople